Ride To Work Day may refer to:

 National Ride to Work Day, an Australian commuter cycling social movement to promote commuting by bicycle
 Ride to Work Day, an event associated with Ride To Work to promote motorcycling as a transportation alternative

See also
 Bike-to-Work Day, an annual event in the U.S. and Canada to promote commuting by bicycle